John Irvin Keasler (August 3, 1921 – September 5, 1995) was an American newspaper columnist for The Miami News, which folded in 1988.

Keasler grew up in Plant City, Florida, which is 26 miles east of Tampa. He got his start in journalism with a newsletter he penned while serving in World War II. He parlayed the newsletter into a job with the Plant City Courier. From there, he moved on to the larger Tampa Tribune and then to The Atlanta Journal-Constitution and the St. Louis Post-Dispatch before settling in for decades at The Miami News. While at the Post-Dispatch, Keasler was one of the founders in 1956 of the Catfish Club, which eventually became the Press Club of Metropolitan St. Louis.

During his 30-year career, Keasler covered both the Kennedy assassination and the 1969 moon landing. Keasler's 7,000 mostly humorous columns about South Florida life were a great favorite, some of which were collected into books. Keasler also enjoyed playing pranks on his fellow reporters, including some at the rival Miami Herald. He and cartoonist Don Wright, who won two Pulitzer Prizes while at The Miami News, in particular played tricks on one another.

When the News folded, no one was more distraught than Keasler. "I feel half numb, like I've got a head full of cold Crisco," he said at the time. "The News was a living thing with a heart and a soul, and it's dying."

Keasler′s satirical novel, Surrounded on Three Sides, first published in 1958, remains in print.
 
He died in Plant City, Fla., in 1995, at the age of 74.

A scholarship to the University of Miami for a student majoring in print journalism, the John and Marjorie Keasler Journalism Scholarship, is given in his memory.

References

External links 
 John Keasler′s column, "Artist takes Dizzy Gillespie to the edge of the future," The Miami News, 17 December 1985 
 People magazine article on John Keasler′s dog Ryan, who had his own advice column, "Hounded by Woes, Miamians Beg for More of Ryan the Advice Dog," 19 October 1987
 University Press of Florida page on Surrounded on Three Sides 
 John Keasler′s obituary 
 Article and photographs of John Keasler pretending to be hoarding cigarettes, sugar, and other items while working for The Atlanta Journal-Constitution in the 21 August 1950 issue of Life magazine

1921 births
1995 deaths
American columnists
Writers from Miami
St. Louis Post-Dispatch people
American male journalists
American male novelists
20th-century American novelists
People from Plant City, Florida
The Atlanta Journal-Constitution people
American military personnel of World War II
20th-century American male writers
Novelists from Florida